Aetholopus scalaris is a species of beetle in the family Cerambycidae. It was described by Francis Polkinghorne Pascoe in 1865. It is known from the Philippines and Moluccas.

References

Xylorhizini
Beetles described in 1865